Russell Davis or Davies may refer to:

Russ Davis (born 1969), baseball player
Russell Davis (defensive tackle) (born 1975), National Football League player for the Chicago Bears, Arizona Cardinals, Seattle Seahawks and New York Giants 
Russell Davis (running back) (born 1956), Michigan Wolverines/Pittsburgh Steelers
Russell Davies (footballer) (born 1954), Australian rules footballer
Russell Davis (writer) (born 1970), American writer and past president of the Science Fiction Writers of America
Russell C. Davis (general) (born 1938), United States Air Force general and former Chief, National Guard Bureau
Russell C. Davis (politician) (1922–1993), mayor of Jackson, Mississippi
 Russell H. Davis (1897–1976), American school administrator and historian
Derek Russell Davis (1914–1993), British psychiatrist
Russell Davies (born 1946), British radio presenter and journalist
Russell T Davies (born 1963), television scriptwriter